Roberto Gamarra may refer to:

 Roberto Gamarra (footballer, born 1981), Paraguayan football striker
 Roberto Gamarra (football manager) (born 1958), former Argentine and naturalised Paraguayan football midfielder